This is a list of massacres which have occurred in the territory now covered by the modern country of Belgium.

References

Belgium
Massacres

Massacres